Road Dogs (and variants) may refer to:

 Road Dogs (novel), a 2009 novel by Elmore Leonard
 Road Dogs (John Mayall album), 2005
 Road Dogs (Charlie Daniels album), 2000
 Roadog, a large custom motorcycle, built by William "Wild Bill" Gelbke
 Road Dogg, the best-known ring name of American professional wrestler Brian Girard James
 Road Dog, a wardriving homebrew application for the Sony PSP